Juan Guadalupe Ciscomani III (born August 31, 1982) is an American politician serving as the U.S. representative for  since 2023. A Republican, he previously worked as a senior adviser to former Governor Doug Ducey, while also serving as vice chair of the Arizona-Mexico Commission.

Early life and education 

Ciscomani was born in Mexico and raised in Tucson, Arizona. He attended Pima Community College and the University of Arizona, becoming the first member of his family to graduate from college. After graduating, he worked at the University of Arizona as a program development specialist.

Early political career 
Ciscomani ran unsuccessfully for the Arizona Legislature in 2008. He is a member of the Tucson Hispanic Chamber of Commerce and has served as its vice president of outreach. He has also served on the Arizona Civil Rights Advisory Board and the Pima County Commission on Trial Court Appointments.

U.S. House of Representatives

Elections

2022 

In the 2022 elections, Ciscomani ran for a seat in the U.S. House of Representatives as a Republican to represent . He narrowly defeated the Democratic nominee, Kirsten Engel, in the general election.

Committee assignments
Committee on Appropriations
Subcommittee on Financial Services and General Government
Subcommittee on Labor, Health and Human Services, Education
Subcommittee on Transportation, Housing and Urban Development, and Related Agencies
Committee on Veterans' Affairs
Subcommittee on Disability Assistance and Memorial Affairs
Subcommittee on Economic Opportunity

Personal life 
Ciscomani resides in Tucson. He and his wife, Laura, have six children.

Electoral history

Notes

See also

List of Hispanic and Latino Americans in the United States Congress

References

External links
Representative Juan Ciscomani official U.S. House website
Juan Ciscomani for Congress campaign website

|-

1982 births
American politicians of Mexican descent
Arizona Republicans
Hispanic and Latino American members of the United States Congress
Hispanic and Latino American people in Arizona politics
Living people
Mexican emigrants to the United States
People from Hermosillo
Politicians from Tucson, Arizona
Republican Party members of the United States House of Representatives from Arizona
University of Arizona alumni